Kharesma Ravichandran (born 8 May 2000) is a British playback singer for Tamil cinema films. Her first public performance came at the age of four for the British Heart Foundation. A professionally trained western vocalist, Ravichandran began her playback singing career in 2014, with her debut coming in the Tamil film Yennai Arindhaal (2015). She is currently signed as an independent artist under Hiphop Tamizha’s label “Underground”.

Early life
In 2011 she moved to India for schooling and due to her parents' work. 
She has completed her Grade 8 in vocals and Grade 5 in Piano for the Trinity College London - Music. She lived in Sri Lanka, studying at The Elizabeth Moir School.

Career
In 2011, Kharesma moved to India where she began learning Hindustani and Carnatic music. She started singing jingles for advertisements such as Chicking, Alsa Mall and Impulse Perfume.

She started her career as an Indian Playback singer for a Gautham Vasudev Menon film Yennai Arindhaal with the song "Yaen Ennai" composed by Harris Jayaraj. Her rise to fame was then triggered in part by the song "Kadhal Cricketu" in the film Thani Oruvan, composed by Hiphop Tamizha duo Aadhi and Jeeva. Kadhal Cricketu topped the Indian iTunes Chart and many radio stations in Chennai and other Tamil speaking channels all over the world for several weeks. This was followed by further success with her next song "Party with the Pei" in Aranmanai 2 by Sundar C, again composed by Hiphop Thamizha. The song also topped the Apple iTunes and radio charts for a number of weeks.

Since then, she was nominated for the 63rd Filmfare - Best Female Singer Award, SIIMA 2016 for Best Playback singer and Edison Awards 2016.

Kharesma has also sung the theme song for a Nepali TV show called PS Zindagi.

In January 2020, she released her first single "Marandhitiyo", which featured Paul B Salius and MadPanda, from her upcoming EP under the Underground Tribe label led by Hiphop Tamizha.

Discography

References

2000 births
Living people
Tamil musicians
Tamil playback singers
Indian women playback singers
Indian child singers
Singers from London
Women Carnatic singers
Carnatic singers
Indian women classical singers
21st-century Indian women singers
21st-century Indian singers
21st-century British women singers